A sex machine is a mechanical device used to simulate human sexual intercourse or other sexual activity.

Devices can be penetrative or extractive. The term fucking machine is generally used to describe a penetrative machine which works by the transfer of rotational or reciprocating force from a motor to a directional motion on a shaft tipped by a dildo. A hand-held modified reciprocating saw device is sometimes called a fucksaw, a hand-held modified drill motor rotating device is sometimes called a drilldo, and a modified jigsaw is called a jillsaw. An extractive device works like a milking machine and can be attached to the penis, breast, or other body part.

History and use

Built in 1900, the first known sex machine was a self-operated device that sprayed milk into the vagina to simulate ejaculation.  

The vibrator was originally invented for the treatment of hysteria in Victorian women through medical orgasm induced by clitoral massage.  These early mechanical devices were much larger and more powerful than the modern vibrators; they were first used by physicians and became popular in bath houses in Europe and the US towards the beginning of the 20th century.  More compact, electrically powered versions later briefly appeared as health aids in department store catalogs.

Modern automated erotic stimulation devices differ from vibrators because they penetrate as well as throb. These devices are sometimes used as part of auto-erotic or partnered bondage play. Teledildonics combines use of various sex machines and a web interface, used remotely by a partner. Modern sex machines on the market include vacuum pumps, instruments that deliver calibrated electrical shocks to the nipples and genitals, and life size inflatable male and female dolls with penetrable and vibrating orifices.

The conference Arse Elektronika regularly features demonstrations of sex machines and academic debates about these devices.

Risk of injury
In 2009, a woman from Maryland required a medical evacuation after the blade of a homemade sex machine cut through the plastic dildo and caused severe vaginal injuries.

Examples 

 Fuckzilla (by kink.com): a sex machine featuring a dildo and a licking device (2007)
 Nekropneum Fuckenbrust Neckhammer 40k: a sex machine by group monochrom that was featured at NRW-Forum Düsseldorf in March 2019

In popular culture
In the 2008 film Burn After Reading, US Treasury agent Harry Pfarrer builds a pedal-powered "dildo chair". The pornographic website Fucking Machines has been featured in the mainstream press as a source of information and depictions of uses.

In 2011, J. Michael Bailey provided a forum for a live demonstration of a sex machine device to his class at Northwestern University, which led to international press coverage, questions about appropriate college coursework, and questions about academic freedom vis-a-vis tenure.

See also

Arse Elektronika
Erotic electrostimulation
Erotic furniture
List of BDSM equipment
Pussy torture
Sex toy
Sex robot
Sybian
Venus for Men

References

Sex toys
Machine sex
BDSM equipment
Masturbation